KL Eco City, or KLEC for short, is a 25-acre integrated mixed-use development project in the city of Kuala Lumpur, Malaysia. The project is built at the site of former Haji Abdullah Hukum Village. The mixed development project is helmed by S P Setia Berhad under a joint-venture agreement with the Kuala Lumpur City Hall (DBKL). It is built in stages comprising 3 residential towers, one serviced apartments tower, 3 corporate office towers, 12 boutique office blocks and a retail mall.

Master Plan 

 Aspire Tower
 Amari Hotel
 KL Eco City Integrated Rail Hub (LRT & KTM Abdullah Hukum stations)
 Retail Podium (KL Eco City Mall)
 Masjid Jamek Abdullah Hukum
 Mercu 2 Corporate Tower (formerly Setia Tower)
 Mercu 3 Corporate Tower (formerly Menara DBKL)
 Strata Office Tower (Menara 1)
 The Pillars Boutique Office (BO1/2/3)
 ViiA Residences
 Residensi Vogue 1 (Vogue Suites One)
 Vogue Suites Two
 Vogue Suites Three

Background and history 

The Haji Abdullah Hukum Village was an urban village located in Kuala Lumpur, Malaysia. It was situated further south along Jalan Bangsar, between the Rapid KL Kelana Jaya Line station named after the village (See: Abdullah Hukum LRT station and Abdullah Hukum Komuter station) and the Klang River. Its area is surrounded by Bangsar, Mid Valley City and Kerinchi.

History of the village
Haji Abdullah Hukum Village was one of Kuala Lumpur's early Malay settlements, with a 200-year-old history.

The village was named after Haji Abdullah Hukum, whose given name was Muhammad Rukun Hukum. He came to Malaya from Sumatera, Indonesia at the age of 15 with his father back in the 19th century. To earn a living, he worked as a farmer and a laborer before he started opening lands and villages with the consent of Raja Laut, who was then the Raja Muda (crown prince) of Selangor.

Abdullah was later chosen by Raja Laut to head a mosque in Pudu. He was also given the authority to start a nursery in Bukit Nanas and to open a village in Sungai Putih (now Jalan Bangsar). After retiring, he continued to stay in the village in Sungai Putih which is now known as Haji Abdullah Hukum Village located just opposite the well known Mid Valley Megamall in Kuala Lumpur.

Despite initially starting as a Malay settlement, the village boasts a multiracial population of ethnic Malays, Chinese and Indians. There is even a Hindu temple, Sri Sakthi Nageswary Temple, located within the village close by a highway overpass.

Development 

In 2007, it was reported that the 200-year-old Haji Abdullah Hukum Village has been earmarked for development. The village has been marked for a major development comprising numerous condominiums, office blocks, shopping complexes and even a transit hub.

Public transportation 
KL Eco City is currently served by the   Abdullah Hukum station on the KTM Port Klang and LRT Kelana Jaya Lines.

A pedestrian link bridge connecting KL Eco City and Mid Valley City is just a minute away from the  Mid Valley Komuter station on the Seremban Line.

See also 

 Bangsar South
 KL Metropolis
 Setia Alam

References
General reference

 Low, C. (2007),Goodbye to another urban kampung, The Star, 31 July 2007.

Specific references

External links 

 KL Eco City by SP Setia Group
 KLEC Mall website
 S P Setia Berhad Group
 Residensi Vogue 1
 Amari Kuala Lumpur @ KL Eco City

Suburbs in Kuala Lumpur
Villages in Kuala Lumpur